Edward Kosi (born 28 January 1999) is a New Zealand professional rugby league footballer who plays as a er for the New Zealand Warriors in the NRL. He attended De La Salle College, Māngere East and played all his junior footy for Mangere East Hawks

Playing career

2021
Kosi made his first grade debut in round 8 of the 2021 NRL season, starting on the wing for the New Zealand Warriors against North Queensland.

2022
In round 7 of the 2022 NRL season against Melbourne, Kosi was responsible for multiple errors which lead to tries in New Zealand's record 70-10 loss at AAMI Park.
The following day, Kosi was the only player demoted to reserve grade from the New Zealand Warriors side following the defeat.  In round 22 of the 2022 NRL season, Kosi scored two tries for New Zealand in a 42-18 victory over Canterbury.
Kosi played a total of eleven games for the New Zealand Warriors as they finished 15th on the table.

References

External links
New Zealand Warriors profile
New Zealand Warriors 9s profile

1999 births
Living people
New Zealand rugby league players
New Zealand Warriors players
Rugby league players from Auckland
Rugby league wingers